Persian red is a deep reddish orange earth or pigment from the Persian Gulf composed of a silicate of iron and alumina, with magnesia.  It is also called artificial vermillion.

The first recorded use of Persian red as a color name in English was in 1895.

Other colors associated with Persia include Persian pink, Persian rose, Persian orange, Persian blue and Persian green.

In human culture
Architecture
 Henry Hobson Richardson insisted upon a ground of Persian red for the murals John LaFarge executed lining the interior of Trinity Church, Boston.

See also
 List of inorganic pigments

References

Persian red
Inorganic pigments